Odette Laure (28 February 1917 – 10 June 2004) was a French actress and cabaret singer. She appeared in more than 50 films and television shows between 1950 and 2001. She was nominated for the César Award for Best Supporting Actress for Daddy Nostalgia (1990). She was born Odette Yvonne Marie Dhommée in Paris, where she died.

Selected filmography

References

External links

Odette Laure at Evene.fr

1917 births
2004 deaths
French film actresses
Actresses from Paris
20th-century French actresses